Little Elm High School is a public high school in Little Elm, Texas, United States and classified as a 6A school by the University Interscholastic League (UIL). It is part of the Little Elm Independent School District located in east central Denton County.

Attendance area
The school district, and therefore the high school's attendance zone, includes:
 The majority of Little Elm
 All of: Lakewood Village, and Hackberry
 Portions of: The Colony, Oak Point and Frisco.

Academics

In 2015, the school was rated "Met Standard" by the Texas Education Agency.

UIL Number Sense Champions 
1993(2A), 1994(2A)

Athletics
The Little Elm Lobos compete in UIL district 14-6A in the following sports: Volleyball, Cross Country, Cheerleading, Drill Team, Marching Band, Football, Basketball, Power lifting, Soccer, Golf, Tennis, Track, Baseball, and Softball.  Beginning with the 2020-21 school year, wrestling has been offered as an option.

2016-2017 Boys basketball; 2016-2017 District 14-5A champions, ranked 2nd in conference 5A by the TABC (Texas Association of Basketball Coaches) at end of regular season; Bi-District Champions

2021 protest incident
On Friday, November 19, 2021, a walkout protest was held in response to a student claiming that she was sexually harassed by another student on a bus but was herself disciplined upon reporting the incident. Police were called to the scene when the students became disruptive and began making threats.  In response to the increased disruption, officers used pepper spray and tasers on some students; four students were arrested for assaulting the police officers. The school district proceeded to host a "listening session" with parents and students to hear their concerns.

Demographics and statistics
The school is composed of 53% male, 47% female, with a 61% minority enrollment. 48% of students participate in the free or reduced lunch program.

Notable alumni
 Cole Beasley, American football player, Rapper
 Trevante Rhodes, American actor, former sprinter
 Richard Sánchez, Professional soccer player with Major League Soccer 
 R. J. Hampton, Basketball Player
 Joey Sonntag, former NASCAR driver and NASCAR Truck team owner

References

External links
 

Public high schools in Texas
Schools in Denton County, Texas
High schools in Denton County, Texas
1995 establishments in Texas
Educational institutions established in 1995